Mape is a Papuan language spoken in Morobe Province, Papua New Guinea. Dialects are Mape, Fukac, Naga, Nigac; the latter two may be extinct.

References

Languages of Morobe Province
Huon languages